The Batesville Confederate Monument is located at the southeast corner of Main and Broad Streets in Batesville, Arkansas. The first three-stage have a base trim element, and are unadorned except for inscriptions. The divider between the first and second stages is a projecting shelf, while that above the second and third stages resembles a turreted battlement. The monument was placed in 1907 by local chapters of the United Daughters of the Confederacy.

The monument was listed on the National Register of Historic Places in 1996.

See also
National Register of Historic Places listings in Independence County, Arkansas

References

Cultural infrastructure completed in 1915
Buildings and structures in Batesville, Arkansas
Monuments and memorials on the National Register of Historic Places in Arkansas
National Register of Historic Places in Independence County, Arkansas
Neoclassical architecture in Arkansas
United Daughters of the Confederacy monuments and memorials in Arkansas
1915 establishments in Arkansas